Ahmed Sayyar (Arabic:أحمد سيار) (born 6 September 1993) is a Qatari footballer. He currently plays for Al-Sadd.

Club career 
Sayyar began his professional career with Al-Gharafa SC in 2013. In January 2017 he joined Al Sadd SC.

Club 
Al-Sadd
 Qatar Stars League: 2018-19, 2020-21, 2021-22
 Emir of Qatar Cup: 2017, 2020, 2021
 Qatar Cup: 2017, 2020, 2021
 Sheikh Jassim Cup: 2017, 2019
 Qatari Stars Cup: 2019-20

References

External links
 

Qatari footballers
1993 births
Living people
Al Sadd SC players
Naturalised citizens of Qatar
Al-Gharafa SC players
Qatar Stars League players
Association football midfielders